The Little Czar is a 1954 French-German historical drama film directed by Arthur Maria Rabenalt and starring Luis Mariano, Sonja Ziemann and Iván Petrovich. It is based on the operetta Der Zarewitsch by Franz Lehár. It was shot in Eastmancolor.

The film was shot at Berlin's Spandau Studios and on location in Belgrade and Dubrovnik, then in Yugoslavia. The sets were designed by the art director Fritz Moegle.

Cast
Luis Mariano as Luis Mariano / Aljoscha
Sonja Ziemann as Sonja / Sonja Ilyanova
Iván Petrovich as Großherzog Feodor
Hans Richter as Boris
Paul Henckels as Pawlitsch
Ernst Waldow as Pjotroff
 as Prinzessin Olga von Meinigen-Deinigen
Hanne-Lore Morell as Katja / Katja
Maria Sebaldt as Mascha
Axel Monjé
Gerd Frickhöffer as Wassili
Edelweiß Malchin
Belgrade Ballet Theatre National

See also
The Tsarevich (1929), also with Iván Petrovich
The Tsarevich (1933)

References

External links

1950s historical musical films
German historical musical films
French historical musical films
West German films
Films directed by Arthur Maria Rabenalt
Films based on operettas
Films about dreams
Films set in Russia
Gloria Film films
Films shot at Spandau Studios
1950s German films
1950s French films
1950s German-language films
German-language French films